Shushtar (also Romanized as Shūshtar and Shūstar and Shooshtar) is a city and capital of Shushtar County, Khuzestan Province, Iran.

Much of its past agricultural productivity derives from the irrigation system which centered on the Band-e Kaisar, the first dam bridge in Iran. The whole water system in Shushtar consists of 13 sites called Shushtar Historical Hydraulic System which is registered as a Unesco World Heritage.

History 
In the Elamite times Shushtar was known as Adamdun. In the Achaemenian times its name was Šurkutir. According to tradition, Shushtar was founded by the legendary king Hushang after he built Susa (aka Shush), and the name "Shushtar" was a comparative form meaning "more beautiful than Shush". Josef Marquart also interpreted the name Shushtar as being derived from Shush, but with a slightly different meaning, with the suffix "-tar" indicating a direction. The Arabic name of the city, Tustar, is an adaptation of the Persian form Shushtar.

Shushtar may be the "Sostra" mentioned by Pliny the Elder. It is also known in Syriac literature as a Nestorian bishopric.

During the Sassanian era, it was an island city on the Karun river and selected to become the summer capital. The river was channeled to form a moat around the city, while bridges and main gates into Shushtar were built to the east, west, and south. Several rivers nearby are conducive to the extension of agriculture; the cultivation of sugar cane, the main crop, dates back to 226. A system of subterranean channels called Ghanats, which connected the river to the private reservoirs of houses and buildings, supplied water for domestic use and irrigation, as well as to store and supply water during times of war when the main gates were closed. Traces of these ghanats can still be found in the crypts of some houses.

Under the caliphate, Shushtar was the capital of one of the seven kuwar (sub-provinces) that made up Khuzestan. Its kurah likely encompassed the eastern edge of the northern Khuzestan plain. Today, this area is inhabited by semi-nomadic people, and only lightly - which possibly explains why al-Maqdisi wrote that he "[knew] no towns" that were dependencies of Shushtar.

Historically, Shushtar was always one of the most important textile-producing cities in Khuzestan. Authors throughout the middle ages consistently listed a diverse array of textile products manufactured at Shushtar. For example, al-Istakhri (writing  933) listed dibaj (brocade) and tiraz; al-Maqdisi (writing  1000) listed dibaj, anmat (carpets), cotton, and Merv-style clothes; and Hafiz-i Abru (writing  1430) recorded dibaj, tiraz, and harir (silk). Shushtar's commercial importance was recognized by its being chosen to produce the Kiswah (the embroidered covering for the Kaaba) in 933 — a major honor with political importance.

According to al-Maqdisi's account, there was a cemetery right in the middle of Shushtar. Nanette Marie Pyne says that this is "not as unusual a phenomenon as it sounds: cemeteries in this part of Iran are often placed on the highest ground, in some places to avoid the raised water table, in others to avoid taking cultivable land out of production." In the case of Shushtar, the highest ground would have been in the middle of the city, on top of the settlement mound formed by Parthian and Sasanian occupation. Al-Maqdisi also describes that Shushtar's mosque was located "in the middle of the markets in the cloth merchants' area." A second cloth market was located by the city gate. The cloth fullers' area was located by the bridge, which was nearby.

Al-Maqdisi described Shushtar as being surrounded by orchards including date palms, grapes, and citrons. An alternate manuscript also lists "fine pomegranates" and "superior pears".

Ibn Battuta visited, noting "On both banks of the river, there are orchards and water-wheels, the river itself is deep and over it, leading to the travelers' gate, there is a bridge upon boats."

The ancient fortress walls were destroyed at the end of the Safavid era.

1831 cholera epidemic 

In 1831, a cholera epidemic ravaged Shushtar, killing about half of the city's inhabitants. The Mandaean community was hit particularly hard during the Plague of Shushtar, as all of their priests had died in the plague. Yahya Bihram, the surviving son of a deceased priest, went on to revive the Mandaean priesthood in Shushtar.

Late 1800s to present 
Shushtar benefited from the Karun steamship service established in 1887. It was the farthest point upstream that the boats went, and goods had to be unloaded here and sent overland by caravan. It developed into the main commercial center in southwestern Iran, and by 1938 it had 28,000 residents. During the early 20th century, the city suffered from unrest between its Haydari and Ne'mati factions. The typical Haydari-Ne'mati rivalry also took on a political dimension in Shushtar, since the Haydaris were pro-Arab and pro-monarchy while the Ne'matis were pro-Bakhtiyari and pro-constitutionalist.

With the completion of the Trans-Persian Railway, Shushtar began to decline. The railway bypassed Shushtar in favor of Ahvaz, which took over Shushtar's commercial importance, and Shushtar's population decreased.

Band-e Kaisar 

The Band-e Kaisar ("Caesar's dam") is believed by some to be a Roman built arch bridge [since Roman captured soldiers were used in its construction], and the first in the country to combine it with a dam. When the Sassanian Shah Shapur I defeated the Roman emperor Valerian, he is said to have ordered the captive Roman soldiers to build a large bridge and dam stretching over 500 metres. Lying deep in Persian territory, the structure which exhibits typical Roman building techniques became the most eastern Roman bridge and Roman dam. Its dual-purpose design exerted a profound influence on Iranian civil engineering and was instrumental in developing Sassanid water management techniques. While the traditional account is disputable, it's not implausible that Roman prisoners of war were involved in its construction.

The approximately 500 m long overflow dam over the Karun, Iran's most effluent river, was the core structure of the Shushtar Historical Hydraulic System, a large irrigation complex from which Shushtar derived its agricultural productivity, and which has been designated World Heritage Site by the UNESCO in 2009. The arched superstructure carried across the important road between Pasargadae and the Sassanid capital Ctesiphon. Many times repaired in the Islamic period, the dam bridge fell out of use in the late 19th century, leading to the degeneration of the complex system of irrigation.

Registration of ancient works in UNESCO World Heritage 
Ancient works of Shushtar, which were registered at the annual meeting of the UNESCO World Heritage Committee on June 26, 2009, under the title of Shushtar Historical Water System, as the tenth work of Iran in the UNESCO World Heritage List with number 1315.

People and culture 

The people of Shushtar, called Shushtaris, maintain a unique cultural heritage stretching back to ancient times, and a Persian dialect called Shushtari dialect distinct to their group.

The devoutness of Shushtar's people has led to it being nicknamed "Dar al-Mu'minin".

Local tradition attributes certain customs to ancient Roman colonists, as well as the construction of the Band-e Kaisar and the introduction of brocade manufacturing technique.

Climate
Shushtar has a hot semi-arid climate (Köppen climate classification BSh) with extremely hot summers and mild winters. Frost does occasionally occur at night during winter, but winters in Shushtar have no snow.

Notable people
 Sayyed Bozorg Mahmoody, anesthesiologist accused of taking his American wife Betty and their daughter Mahtob to Iran and allegedly keeping them hostage

 Mohammad Ali Mousavi Jazayeri, Twelver Shia cleric

 Mohammad-Ali Emam-Shooshtari, historian and religious scholar 

 Sahl Shushtari, early classical Sufi mystic

 Qazi Nurullah Shustari, eminent Shia faqih (jurist) and scholar

 Nematollah Jazayeri, prominent Shia scholar

 Mohammad-Taqi Shoushtari, Iranian Twelver Shia scholar

 Sheikh Jafar Shooshtari, prominent Shia scholar

See also 
 Sahl al-Tustari, a medieval Islamic scholar and early Sufi mystic born in Shushtar
 Sheikh Jafar Shooshtari, a prominent Shia scholar
 Sohrab Gilani, the representative of Shushtar in Majles

References

Sources

External links 

 Visiting Shushtar Photo Essay
 Hamid-Reza Hosseini, Shush at the foot of Louvre (Shush dar dāman-e Louvre), in Persian, Jadid Online, 10 March 2009, شوش در دامن لوور.Audio slideshow: Untitled Document (6 min 31 sec).
 Pictures of Shushtar on Fotopedia.
 Picture of Shushtar Farsi

Populated places in Shushtar County
Cities in Khuzestan Province
Archaeology of Iran
Roman sites in Asia